The , also called  was the first group of boats of the Type B cruiser submarines built for the Imperial Japanese Navy (IJN) during the 1940s.

Design and description
They displaced  surfaced and  submerged.

For surface running, the boats were powered by two  diesel engines, each driving one propeller shaft. When submerged each propeller was driven by a  electric motor. They could reach  on the surface and  underwater.

The boats were armed with six internal bow  torpedo tubes and carried a total of 17 torpedoes. They were also armed with a single /40 deck gun and two single mounts for  Type 96 anti-aircraft guns. In the Type Bs, the aircraft hangar was faired into the base of the conning tower. A single catapult was positioned on the forward deck. Late in the war, some of the submarines had their aircraft hangar removed, to replace it with an additional 14 cm gun. In 1944, I-36 and I-37 had their aircraft hangar and catapult removed so that they could carry four Kaiten manned torpedoes, with I-36 later being further modified to carry six.

Service
The series was rather successful, especially at the beginning of the war.

 shelled an oil field up the beach from Santa Barbara and damaged a pump house in Elwood in February 1942. She was sunk by the New Zealand trawler Tui and two US Navy aircraft off Noumea on 19 August 1943.
On 15 September 1942  fired six torpedoes at the aircraft carrier USS Wasp, three of which hit the carrier and sank her. The three remaining torpedoes went on for several thousand meters and hit another carrier force, damaging the battleship USS North Carolina and sinking the destroyer USS O'Brien.
 conducted one of the few attacks on the continental United States in September 1942. A year later she was sunk by destroyer USS Patterson off the New Hebrides on 3 September 1943.
 sank the US Army chartered merchant ship SS Cynthia Olson about 1,000 miles northeast of Pearl Harbor on 7 December 1941, causing 35 fatalities. She also crippled the aircraft carrier  with one torpedo hit (out of six fired) on 31 August 1942. On 13 November 1942, she sank the cruiser USS Juneau. She was sunk off Leyte in October 1944.
 Between June 1942 and February  1944, she sank several ships including:   en route Whyalla-Newcastle, SS Fort Mumford and SS Montanan in the Indian Ocean, Liberty ship SS Sambridge, and the SS Khedive Ismail near the Maldives on February 12, 1944. Following her last success, she was sunk by escorting British warships.
 was used to conduct personnel, gold, and technology exchanges with Germany during WW2. Her most famous Yanagi mission was the successful transfer on 26 April 1943 off the coast of Mozambique, Africa, and safe return to Japan from German U-180 with Netaji Subhas Chandra Bose, leader of the Indian Independence Movement and Indian National Army who was going from Berlin to Tokyo, and his Adjutant, Abid Hasan, while two Japanese naval officers sent to study U-boat construction and 2 tons of gold were transferred to U-180 as Japanese payment for German wartime technology. Both submarines returned safely to their bases.
 on 12 September 1943, torpedoed the 205 ft fleet tug USS Navajo en route from Pago Pago towing a gas barge.

Losses

 was sunk off San Cristobol on 2 November 1942 by destroyer .
 was sunk by  25 November 1943
 made her final report on 27 November 1943, off the Gilbert Islands, following which she was never heard from again. At least one source attributes her sinking to aircraft from escort carrier  on 29 November 1943.
 was lost in February 1942, following a final report made from off Oahu.  
She was first rammed by Paladin then torpedoed by Petard.
 was the first Japanese submarine to reach Europe under the Yanagi missions, but she was sunk by a mine off Singapore on 13 October 1942.
 was lost during sea trials in the Inland Sea on 13 June 1944.  
 was sunk by destroyer  near Yap on 12 November 1944.
 was sunk by destroyer  in the Gilberts on 26 November 1943.

Altogether the Type B submarines (B1, B2, and B3 combined) are credited with sinking 56 merchant ships for a total of 372,730 tonnes, about 35% of all merchant shipping sunk by Japanese submarines during the war.

See also
 Type B submarine

Notes

References
 

Submarine aircraft carriers
Submarine classes